The  is a rigid-frame bridge in Japan that connects Matsue, Shimane Prefecture, and Sakaiminato, Tottori Prefecture, over Nakaumi lake. It was built from 1997 to 2004, and it is the largest rigid-frame bridge in Japan and the third largest in the world. Images of the bridge have been widely circulated on the internet, owing to its seemingly steep nature when photographed from a distance with a telephoto lens, but in actuality, it has a less pronounced, 6.1% gradient in the side of Shimane and a 5.1% gradient in the side of Tottori.

Eshima Ohashi Bridge replaced the previous drawbridge, since traffic was obstructed often by ships for about 7 to 8 minutes, only vehicles under 14 tons were allowed and only 4000 vehicles could cross it per day.

Gallery

References

External links 
 

Bridges in Japan
Buildings and structures in Shimane Prefecture
Buildings and structures in Tottori Prefecture
Bridges completed in 2004